Dinner for Two (Swedish: Supé för två) is a 1947 Swedish romantic comedy film directed by Ragnar Arvedson and starring Edvin Adolphson, Karin Ekelund and Gaby Stenberg. It was shot at the Centrumateljéerna Studios in Stockholm. Location shooting took place around Cannes and Nice. The film's sets were designed by the art director Hannu Leminen. It was based on a play by André-Paul Antoine, which had previously been adapted into the 1943 French film The Inevitable Monsieur Dubois.

Synopsis
Louise Mareuil runs a luxury perfume business on the French Riviera. While driving in her car one day she knocks down a motorcyclist who turns out to be a commercial artist. He rapidly turns her life upside down.

Cast
 Edvin Adolphson as 	Claude Dubois
 Karin Ekelund as 	Louise Mareuil
 Gaby Stenberg as 	Jacqueline
 Ragnar Arvedson as 	Verdier
 Douglas Håge as 	Mouche
 Mimi Pollak as Sophie
 Josua Bengtson as 	Concierge
 Albert Ståhl as 	Cashier
 Eric Fröling as 	Valet 
 Börje Nyberg as 	Mechanic
 Ingrid Aréhn as 	Juliette 
 Ann-Marie Wiman as 	Saleswoman
 Bert Sorbon as 	Waiter

References

Bibliography 
 Qvist, Per Olov & von Bagh, Peter. Guide to the Cinema of Sweden and Finland. Greenwood Publishing Group, 2000.

External links 
 

1947 films
Swedish comedy films
1947 comedy films
1940s Swedish-language films
Films directed by Ragnar Arvedson
Swedish black-and-white films
Films set in France
Films shot in France
Remakes of French films
Swedish films based on plays
1940s Swedish films